Souleymane Oularé (born 16 October 1972) is a Guinean retired professional footballer who played as a forward. His son Obbi is also a professional footballer.

Career
Oularé was elected Footballer of the Year in Belgium in 1999, when he won the Belgian Championship as a striker with Racing Genk, scoring 17 goals during the season. He then went on to play for Fenerbahçe (Turkey), UD Las Palmas (Spain), Stoke City (England), K. Beringen-Heusden-Zolder and C.S. Visé (both Belgium).

Oularé signed for Stoke City in England in 2002. After his only league game for Stoke against Northampton Town in 2002 Oulare was diagnosed with a life-threatening blood clot in his lungs. He returned for the 2nd leg of the play-offs against Cardiff City and made a vital contribution. He came on after 71 minutes replacing Chris Iwelumo with Stoke 2–1 down, James O'Connor scored in the 88th minute to send the tie into extra time and then in the 115th minute an O'Connor free-kick was deflected in off Oularé's backside. This went down in folklore among Stoke City fans as they won the tie 3–2 and went on to win promotion. He never got a chance the following season and was released in 2003.

Career statistics

Club

International

Honours
Genk
Belgian First Division: 1998–99
Belgian Cup: 1997–98

References

1972 births
Living people
Sportspeople from Conakry
Guinean footballers
Belgian people of Guinean descent
Association football forwards
Guinea international footballers
Guinea youth international footballers
1994 African Cup of Nations players
1998 African Cup of Nations players
Belgian Pro League players
Challenger Pro League players
Süper Lig players
La Liga players
English Football League players
K. Sint-Niklase S.K.E. players
K.S.K. Beveren players
S.V. Zulte Waregem players
Fenerbahçe S.K. footballers
K.R.C. Genk players
Stoke City F.C. players
UD Las Palmas players
C.S. Visé players
Guinean expatriate footballers
Guinean expatriate sportspeople in Belgium
Expatriate footballers in Belgium
Guinean expatriate sportspeople in Turkey
Expatriate footballers in Turkey
Guinean expatriate sportspeople in Spain
Expatriate footballers in Spain
Guinean expatriate sportspeople in England
Expatriate footballers in England